The 1921 Canton Bulldogs season was their second in the league. The team improved on their previous output of 7–4–2, losing only two NFL games. They finished fourth in the league.

Schedule

 Games in italics are against non-NFL teams.

Standings

References

Canton Bulldogs seasons
Canton Bulldogs
Canton Bulldogs